Kevin David Sorbo (born September 24, 1958) is an American actor. He had starring roles in two television series: as Hercules in Hercules: The Legendary Journeys, and as Captain Dylan Hunt in Andromeda. Sorbo is also known for acting in the Christian films such as God's Not Dead and Let There Be Light.

Early life and education
Sorbo was born in Mound, Minnesota, on September 24, 1958. He is of Norwegian descent. He was raised in a Lutheran family. Sorbo attended Minnesota State University Moorhead, where he double majored in marketing and advertising. To help pay for tuition, he began to work as a model for print and television advertising.

Career
In the mid 1980s, Sorbo traveled around Europe and Australia working in television commercials and also modeled for print advertisements. By the early 1990s, he had appeared in over 150 commercials. One of the popular commercials he appeared in was for Jim Beam bourbon whiskey, known for Sorbo's repeated catchphrase "This ain't Jim Beam". He occasionally landed acting roles during this period and made his acting debut in an episode of the soap opera Santa Barbara in 1986. This was followed by guest appearances in television series such as 1st & Ten, Murder She Wrote and The Commish. In 1992, he starred in an unsuccessful pilot for a medical drama series titled Condition: Critical which was not picked up but aired as a television film on ABC. He was considered for and lost out to Dean Cain as Superman in Lois & Clark: The New Adventures of Superman and was a possible contender for the role of Fox Mulder in The X-Files which went to David Duchovny. In 1993, he made his film debut playing a supporting role in Slaughter of the Innocents.

In 1993, he received his breakthrough leading role as the Ancient Greek mythical demigod Hercules in a series of five television films which aired in 1994 as part of Universal Television's Action Pack. The first film to premiere was Hercules and the Amazon Women which aired in April 1994 and the subsequent films aired later in the year. The ratings success of the films paved the way for the commissioning of the television series Hercules: The Legendary Journeys which started airing in syndication from January 1995 and ran for six seasons. The series made Sorbo an international star and was one of the highest rated syndicated television shows at the time. Sorbo also directed two episodes of the series during its run and co-wrote one episode. 

The success of the show spawned the popular spin-off series Xena: Warrior Princess starring Lucy Lawless, who was introduced in a three episode arc in the first season of Hercules. This allowed several characters from both shows to make crossover appearances. Sorbo made his first of two appearances on Xena in the Season One episode "Prometheus" in 1995. In 1998, a spin-off direct-to-video animated film titled Hercules and Xena – The Animated Movie: The Battle for Mount Olympus was released with both Sorbo and Lawless voicing the characters.

Hercules was canceled midway through the filming of Season Six of which only eight episodes were produced and the final episode aired in November 1999. This was reportedly due to Sorbo declining to extend his contract to continue starring in the series for a further three years. Although it was not revealed at the time, health issues reduced his abilities to perform the physically demanding role during the later seasons. Sorbo made his final appearance as Hercules on Xena in the Season Five episode "God Fearing Child" which aired in February 2000.

In between the years playing Hercules, Sorbo played his first leading film role in Kull the Conqueror (1997). After Hercules came to an end, Sorbo played the starring role of Captain Dylan Hunt in the science-fiction drama series Andromeda from 2000 to 2005. In 2006, he played a recurring role on the final season of The O.C. and guest-starred in the sitcom Two and a Half Men. In 2007, he starred in the direct-to-video film Walking Tall: The Payback, which was a sequel to the 2004 film Walking Tall. He reprised his role in the second sequel, Walking Tall: Lone Justice, which released later that year. He also starred in the Lifetime Channel film Last Chance Café, the Hallmark Channel film Avenging Angel, co-starring his real life wife Sam Jenkins and guest starred as a bounty hunter in the season-two episode "Bounty Hunters!" of the series Psych. He appeared in the 2008 spoof film Meet the Spartans, which was a box office success despite being universally negatively reviewed by critics. He starred in the Albert Pyun directed science fiction vampire film Tales of an Ancient Empire.

Sorbo was executive producer and star of the movie Abel's Field in 2012.

Sorbo voiced one of the main protagonists, Prometheus, in the Wii video game The Conduit.
Sorbo returned to the role of Hercules in a more sinister portrayal, in the video game God of War III, which was released for the PlayStation 3 in March 2010.

Sorbo had a prominent role in the film Soul Surfer released in 2011.

In July 2013, Sorbo, along with his wife Sam, provided voice over for characters in the video game Cloudberry Kingdom. In 2014, Sorbo co-starred in God's Not Dead, a Christian film in which he portrayed an atheist college professor who requires his students to disown their religions on the first day of his class. He also voiced Crusher in the Skylanders franchise and Retro Hercules in Smite.

In 2014 to 2016, Sorbo played wizard Gojun Pye in a series of five Mythica sword-and-sorcery fantasy movies.

In 2017, Sorbo played the ill-fated King Lar Gand of Daxam on the CW series Supergirl. He appeared opposite Teri Hatcher as his wife Queen Rhea—24 years earlier, they were almost cast opposite each other in Lois and Clark before Sorbo lost out to Dean Cain. Cain also appeared in the same series but did not share any scenes with them. That same year, he also directed and starred in the Christian drama film Let There Be Light.

Personal life
On January 5, 1998, Sorbo married actress Sam Sorbo (née Jenkins) whom he met the previous year when she had a small recurring role on Hercules (Season 3, Episode 8 "Prince Hercules"). They have three children. Sorbo is the spokesman and chair of A World Fit for Kids! (AWFFK!), a non-profit organization that trains teenagers to become mentors to younger children.

In 2001, Sorbo was featured on a celebrity edition of the game show Who Wants to Be a Millionaire, winning $32,000; the money was donated to his charity, A World Fit For Kids.

In 2015, Sorbo provided the foreword to Stan Holden's book Giving Candy to Strangers.

Health
In late 1997, while on a publicity tour for Kull the Conqueror and between the fourth and fifth seasons of Hercules, the newly engaged Sorbo experienced an aneurysm in his shoulder which caused three strokes. As a result, he was weakened for the next several years, a condition kept secret from the public while he recovered. During the last two seasons of Hercules (the fifth and sixth, which aired in 1998 and 1999), Sorbo had a reduced filming schedule to accommodate his condition, and more guest stars were featured in the show in order to reduce Sorbo's duties. The strokes, thought to be triggered when chiropractic manipulation of his shoulder released blood clots from the aneurysm, left Sorbo with a permanent 10 percent vision loss, weakness, impaired balance, and migraines. In his 2011 autobiography True Strength, Sorbo revealed the details of his injury and how his wife Sam helped him recover.

In 2013, Sorbo received the Public Leadership in Neurology Award from the American Academy of Neurology and the American Brain Foundation for his efforts raising awareness about stroke. He also received the 2013 Inspiration Honors Award from the Invisible Disabilities Association.

Religion

Sorbo is a Christian and attends a nondenominational church, though he grew up as a Lutheran. Sorbo claims that his religious views have caused certain restrictions in Hollywood productions, stating that "there's a negativity towards Christians in Hollywood, and a negativity towards people who believe in God."

In 2014, during an interview with Jerry Newcombe on the radio show Vocal Point, Sorbo defended Mel Gibson against allegations that his 2004 film, The Passion of the Christ, was anti-Semitic with the words: "News bulletin: you did kill Jesus!" Sorbo later stated he could have rephrased his statements, but defended his stance.

Filmography

Film

Television

Video games

References

External links

1958 births
20th-century American male actors
20th-century Christians
21st-century American male actors
21st-century Christians
American Christians
American male film actors
American male television actors
American male voice actors
American memoirists
American people of English descent
American people of German descent
American people of Norwegian descent
American people of Scottish descent
American television directors
Christians from Minnesota
Former Lutherans
Living people
Male actors from Minnesota
Male Western (genre) film actors
Minnesota Independents
Minnesota Republicans
Minnesota State University Moorhead alumni
People from Mound, Minnesota